The Furman Bluffs are a line of steep ice bluffs that form the southeast side of Philbin Inlet on Martin Peninsula, Marie Byrd Land, Antarctica. First delineated from aerial photographs taken by U.S. Navy Operation Highjump in January 1947, they were named by the Advisory Committee on Antarctic Names for Master Chief Quartermaster James L. Furman, U.S. Navy, a staff assistant assigned to Antarctic Task Force 43 from 1964 to 1967.

References

Cliffs of Marie Byrd Land